Verkhnyaya Toyma is the name of several rural localities in Russia:
Verkhnyaya Toyma, Arkhangelsk Oblast, a selo in Verkhnetoyemsky Selsoviet of Verkhnetoyemsky District in Arkhangelsk Oblast
Verkhnyaya Toyma, Kirov Oblast, a village in Srednetoymensky Rural Okrug of Vyatskopolyansky District in Kirov Oblast; 
Verkhnyaya Toyma, Udmurt Republic, a village in Udmurt-Toymobashsky Selsoviet of Alnashsky District in the Udmurt Republic